Penn State World Campus is the online campus of Pennsylvania State University. Launched in 1998, World Campus grew out of the university's long and distinguished history in distance education that began in 1892. The mission of World Campus is to extend Penn State's undergraduate and graduate degree and certificate programs to learners who cannot attend another Penn State campus because of geography or life factors. World Campus offers more than 175 online undergraduate and graduate degree and certificate programs in partnership with Penn State academic units, with additional programs being added to the curriculum on a continuing basis. World Campus offices and a major part of its technical infrastructure are located at Innovation Park on the University Park Campus.

Penn State World Campus is accredited by the Middle States Commission on Higher Education (MSCHE).

History 
Penn State started offering distance education courses in 1892, when it launched one of the nation's first correspondence study programs to farmers around Pennsylvania. More than one hundred years later, in 1998, the University reaffirmed its commitment to providing accessible learning to all who need it with the launching of Penn State World Campus. One of several roots underpinning the policy decision to establish World Campus was a decade of experimentation at The American Centre for Study of Distance Education in the College of Education, in which Professor Michael G. Moore developed and taught some of the world's first online courses, including cadres of students in several cities in Mexico and Europe as well as the USA. Penn State Vice-President Jim Ryan became persuaded of the quality of the pedagogy being developed in these courses and in 1992 he commissioned the setting up of a University-wide Task Force to study the potential of a major initiative, the conclusion being that "The Task Force firmly believes that there is a very real possibility that national and international preeminence in distance education may prove to be a prerequisite to national and international preeminence in most other areas of academic enterprise." Moore led the development of the first World Campus Master's degree courses in adult education.

Penn State World Campus uses multiple technologies to make some of Penn State's well-respected graduate, undergraduate, and continuing professional education programs available anytime, anywhere throughout the world.

Programs 
Penn State World Campus offers accredited graduate degrees, undergraduate degrees, certificates, and minors online. Students must be accepted into the appropriate College for their chosen program after the initial acceptance into World Campus. For instance, a student wanting to major in Information Sciences and Technology must be accepted by the College of Information Sciences and Technology located at Penn State's University Park campus. The online courses are taught by the same faculty on campus and the required coursework is the same for both on campus and World Campus students. After graduating, World Campus students earn the same exact degree as University Park campus students. Penn State World Campus students come from all around the world. The diploma will reference graduation from Penn State and does not differentiate University Park campus versus World Campus enrollment.

Rankings 
U.S. News & World Report recognized 12 Penn State World Campus degree programs in their 2020 Best Online Programs rankings:
 No. 8 (tie) in Best Online Bachelor's Programs 
 No. 6 in Best Online Graduate Engineering Programs 
 No. 6 in Best Online Graduate Computer Information Technology Programs 
 No. 8 in Best Online Graduate Business Programs 
 No. 6 (tie) in Best Online MBA Programs 
 No. 7 in Best Online Graduate Education Programs 
 No. 2 in Best Online Graduate Education Programs for Veterans 
 No. 4 in Best Online Graduate Business Programs for Veterans 
 No. 5 in Best Online Graduate Engineering Programs for Veterans 
 No. 5 in Best Online Graduate Computer Information Technology Programs for Veterans 
 No. 6 (tie) in Best Online Bachelor's Programs for Veterans 
 No. 4 in Best Online MBA Programs for Veterans

See also
Pennsylvania State University
Penn State University
Distance education
Higher education
Online university
Online degree
College

References

External links

Distance education institutions based in the United States
Pennsylvania State University
Educational institutions established in 1998
1998 establishments in Pennsylvania